"Cry Baby", written and composed by Martin Isherwood, was the 's entry at the Eurovision Song Contest 2003, performed by the duo Jemini.  It was the first of two songs entered by the United Kingdom to earn no points (nul points) from any other countries.  It was also the first ever English-language song to receive no points.

The song is a simple pop ditty about a woman telling her lover that their relationship is over because he does not love her anymore.  He sings back saying she is being unfair, prolonging the relationship while he has his own life to live.

Selection process 
Jemini were selected to take part in Eurovision by a public phone poll in the BBC's A Song for Europe competition. More than 100,000 votes cast in total for the duo.

Eurovision performance 
For their Eurovision appearance, Chris Cromby and Gemma Abbey were accompanied on stage by three female backing singers, and a guitarist.

The Eurovision failure prompted a great deal of mirth and consternation in the British and European media. Jemini admitted that their performance was off-key, and claimed they were unable to hear the backing track due to a technical fault. Terry Wogan, long-time commentator on the contest for the BBC, said that the UK was suffering from "post-Iraq backlash". Although the majority of the media blamed the result on the poor quality of the song and that it was sung out of tune with Louis Walsh branding the song "a disgrace" and "so out of tune they deserved to be last". Following the show, their dressing room was broken into and vandalised.

Author and historian John Kennedy O'Connor notes in The Eurovision Song Contest – The Official History that with a record field of 26 entries, this made the UK's failure the most spectacular in the history of the contest.

Charts

References 

Eurovision songs of the United Kingdom
Eurovision songs of 2003
2003 singles
2003 in British music
Eurovision songs that scored no points
2003 songs